Prang Ku is a district (amphoe) in the western part of Sisaket province, northeastern Thailand.

Geography
Neighboring districts are (from the north clockwise): Huai Thap Than, Uthumphon Phisai, Wang Hin, and Khukhan of Sisaket Province; Si Narong, Sikhoraphum, and Samrong Thap of Surin province.

History
The minor district (king amphoe) Prang Ku was established on 1 January 1961, when it was split off from Khukhan district. The district is named after Prang Samong in Ban Ku. On 17 July 1963 it was upgraded to a full district.

Administration
The district is divided into 10 sub-districts (tambons), which are further subdivided into 141 villages (mubans). Prang Ku is a township (thesaban tambon) which covers parts of tambon Phimai and Phimai Nuea. There are a further 10 tambon administrative organizations (TAO).

References

External links
 Learning Center in tambon Ban Ku

Prang Ku